Malacocincla is a genus of passerine birds in the family Pellorneidae. The type species for this genus is M. abbotti, and a 2012 study shows that members of the genus Malacocincla as defined earlier fall into multiple clades and are therefore polyphyletic. M. abbotti and M. sepiaria remain within a common clade and could be retained in the genus if generic reassignments occur. This clade is a sister of the genus Napothera. M. cinereiceps and M. malaccensis fall into a different clade and are a sister to the genus Trichastoma and nested within several species of Pellorneum. The position of M. perspicillata has not been resolved.

Species
The genus contains the following species:

References

 
Pellorneidae
Bird genera
Taxa named by Edward Blyth
Taxonomy articles created by Polbot